Waterschap Hollandse Delta (WSHD) is a Dutch regional water authority covering the south of South Holland with its seat in Ridderkerk. The area it encompasses includes Rotterdam (south of the Nieuwe Maas) as well as the (former) islands Goeree-Overflakkee, Hoeksche Waard, Voorne-Putten, the Island of Dordrecht, IJsselmonde, Rozenburg and Tiengemeten.

It is responsible for water management, water quality and sewage water treatment and was formed from a merger of 4 regional water authorities in January 2005.

References

External links

Hollandse Delta
South Holland
Ridderkerk